National Highway 4 or National Road No.4 (10004) (in Khmer ផ្លូវជាតិលេខ ៤) is one of the national highways of Cambodia. Sihanoukville is the only international sea port of Cambodia, making NH4 one of the country's most important highways. The road was built in the 1950s, coinciding with the construction of the port.

The road was built especially for the transport of goods between the capital and the port, by heavy trucks and containers. Portions of NH4 were considered toll roads, with three stations to collect fees. All toll stations have now been removed, the entire road is now toll free. It is also considered the most dangerous road in Cambodia due to the occurrence of several traffic accidents and limited management by authorities. Furthermore, the road is congested and in need of maintenance.

Description 

The road begins at the junction of Pochentong Avenue and National Highway 3. The junction, located in western Phnom Penh near the Phnom Penh International Airport, is in the Sangkat Chaom Chau – Dangkor District. The road initially heads westerly then curves toward the south west.

After the first toll station, NH4 enters Kandal Province. It then crosses Kampong Speu, Koh Kong and Sihanoukville provinces. In the territory of Koh Kong, at Chamkar Luong, National Road 48 branches off west toward Koh Kong town and the Thai border. The junction with NH3, which leads to Kampot to the east beyond to the Vietnamese border is in the territory of Sihanoukville, at Prey Nob District.

Phnom Penh-Sihanoukville Expressway

A 190 km long expressway parallel to highway 4 is under construction, it will be Cambodia's first expressway. The expressway is built through Chinese investment at a cost of $2 billion under a build-operate-transfer contract by China Road and Bridge Corporation. The completion is planned for 2023.

References

Roads in Cambodia